Bell Media holds regional television rights to the Winnipeg Jets, under a 10-year contract that began in the inaugural season (2011–12). Jets games not shown by the league's national broadcast partner, Rogers Media, are televised by The Sports Network (TSN) on its regional channel TSN3 for viewers in the Jets' home region, which includes Manitoba, Saskatchewan, Nunavut, the Northwest Territories (shared with the Calgary Flames and Edmonton Oilers outside of Manitoba), and parts of Northwestern Ontario (shared with the Toronto Maple Leafs). Viewers outside of the Jets' home region can view regional TSN3 broadcasts through a paid subscription for out-of-market games from the NHL or one of its broadcast partners.

Radio
Radio broadcasts are carried by CJOB in Winnipeg and southern Manitoba.

Winnipeg Jets I

Winnipeg Jets II

Television 

Dennis Beyak serves as the play-by-play announcer for the Jets, calling games on TSN3. He is joined by Kevin Sawyer, who provide the colour commentary, and rinkside reporter Sara Orlesky. TSN3 colour commentary duties were formerly handled by Shane Hnidy, who moved to AT&T SportsNet Rocky Mountain to cover the Vegas Golden Knights in 2017.

Winnipeg Jets I

Winnipeg Jets II

See also
Historical NHL over-the-air television broadcasters
Winnipeg Jets (1972–96)
List of Arizona Coyotes broadcasters

References

External links
Broadcast Schedule | Winnipeg Jets - NHL.com
TSN Announces 2018-19 Winnipeg Jets Regional NHL Broadcast Schedule, Featuring 60 Regular Season Games
Jets & Bell Media announce 10-Year broadcast deal

 
Lists of National Hockey League broadcasters
Winnipeg Jets lists
The Sports Network